Discreet is a 2017 American drama film directed by Travis Mathews and starring Jonny Mars. It was screened in the Panorama section at the 67th Berlin International Film Festival.

Cast
 Jonny Mars as Alex
 Atsuko Okatsuka as Mandy
 Joy Cunningham as Sharon
 Jordan Elsass as Zach
 João Federici as Miguel
 Ed Hattaway as Lyel

References

External links
 
 Interview with Travis Mathews and Jonny Mars
 

2017 films
2017 drama films
2017 LGBT-related films
American drama films
American LGBT-related films
LGBT-related drama films
Films directed by Travis Mathews
2010s English-language films
2010s American films